Apulia Station is a hamlet in Onondaga County, New York, United States. Apulia Station has a post office with ZIP code 13020, which opened on August 17, 1861.

References

Hamlets in Onondaga County, New York
Hamlets in New York (state)